Wajahat Hussain Mirza Changezi (20 April 1908 – 4 August 1990) was an Indian screenwriter and film director who penned the dialogues of some of the most successful films in India during the 1950s and 1960s, best known for Mughal-e-Azam (1960) and the Academy Award-nominee, Mother India (1957).

Mirza won Filmfare Best Dialogue Award twice, in 1961 for Mughal-e-Azam, and in 1962 for Ganga Jamuna. He also won the Bengal Film Journalists' Association Awards for Ganga Jamuna.

He was born in Sitapur, a small town 89 kilometers from Lucknow. While studying at Government Jubilee Inter College, Lucknow Mirza became acquainted with cinematographer Krishan Gopal of Calcutta, and worked as his assistant. He later co-produced with singer Midgan Kumar a movie called Anookhi Moohabat ("Crazy Lover") in Bombay.  Mirza became a dialogue and screenplay writer and was also one of the first Indians to be nominated for an Oscar for the movie Mother India (1957), based upon a story by Babubhai Mehta.

Filmography

As director
 1942 - Swaminath
 1942 - Jawani
 1944 - Shahenshah Babar
 1945 - Prabhu Ka Ghar 
 1950 - Nishana

As writer
 1933 -  Yahudi Ki Ladki (As a Dialogue Writer)
 1934 - Anokhi Mohabbat (Dialogue & Screenplay)
 1938 -  Hum Tum Aur Woh (As a Dialogue Writer, Lyrics)
 1938 - Teen Sau Din Ke Baad (As a Dialogue Writer)
 1938 - Watan (Dialogue & Screenplay)
 1939 -  Ek Hi Raasta (As a Dialogue Writer)
 1940 - Aurat (As a Dialogue Writer)
 1941 - Bahen (Dialogue & Screenplay)
 1942 - Roti (As a Dialogue Writer)
 1944 - Lal Haveli (As a Dialogue Writer)
 1944 - Shahenshah Babar (As a Director)
 1945 - Prabhu Ka Ghar (As a Director)
 1945 - Zeenat (Dialogue & Story)
 1948 - Shaheed (As a Dialogue Writer)
 1949 - Chilman (Dialogue & Screenplay)
 1953 - Shikast (Dialogue & Story)
 1956 - Aawaz (As a Dialogue Writer)
 1957 - Mother India (As a Dialogue Writer)
 1958 - Yahudi (As a Dialogue Writer)
 1960 - Kohinoor (As a Dialogue Writer)
 1960 - Mughal-E-Azam (As a Dialogue Writer)
 1961 - Gunga Jumna (Ganga Jamna) (As a Dialogue Writer)
 1964 - Leader (As a Dialogue Writer)
 1967 - Palki (As a Dialogue Writer)
 1969 - Chanda Aur Bijli (As a Dialogue Writer)
 1969 - Shatranj (As a Dialogue Writer)
 1970 - Umang (As a Dialogue Writer)
 1972 - Yeh Gulistan Hamara (Dialogue & Screenplay)
 1973 - Heera (Dialogue & Screenplay)
 1974 - Dukh Sukh (As a Dialogue Writer)
 1978 - Daaku Aur Jawan (As a Dialogue Writer)
 1978 - Ganga Ki Saugandh (As a Dialogue Writer)
 1986 - Love And God (As a Dialogue Writer)

References

Bibliography

External links 
 
 
 

1908 births
1990 deaths
20th-century Indian dramatists and playwrights
20th-century Indian Muslims
Writers from Lucknow
Indian male screenwriters
Filmfare Awards winners
Hindi-language film directors
20th-century Indian film directors
People from Sitapur
Screenwriters from Uttar Pradesh
Film directors from Uttar Pradesh
Hindi screenwriters
20th-century Indian male writers
20th-century Indian screenwriters